The 1989 CONCACAF Champions' Cup was the 25th edition of the CONCACAF Champions' Cup, the premier football club competition organized by CONCACAF, the regional governing body of North America, Central America, and the Caribbean.

UNAM won the final 3–2 on aggregate for their second CONCACAF club title.

Format
The teams were split in two zones, North/Central American and Caribbean, (as North and Central American sections combined to qualify one team for the final), each one qualifying the winner to the final tournament. All the matches in the tournament were played under the home/away match system.

North/Central American Zone

First round
The first leg was played on 9 May, and the second leg was played on 16 May 1982.

Xelajú advanced to the second round after Cruz Azul withdrew from the competition

UNAM advanced to the second round after New York Pancyprian-Freedoms withdrew from the competition

Vida advanced to the second round after Brooklyn Dodgers withdrew from the competition

Comunicaciones won 1–0 on aggregate.

Second round
The first legs were played on 25 April and 27 May, and the second legs were played on 28 April and July 25 2022.

UNAM won 7–2 on aggregate.

Comunicaciones won 2–1 on aggregate.

Third round
The first leg was played on 26 September, and the second leg was played on 29 September 1982.

UNAM won 5–2 on aggregate.

Caribbean Zone

First round
The first legs were played on 16 May, and the second legs were played on 30 May 1982.

Jong Holland won 7–2 on aggregate.

Robinhood won 6–2 on aggregate.

Second round
The first legs were played on 6 and 13 June, and the second legs were played on 18 June and 7 July 1982.

 

Defence Force won 2–1 on aggregate.

Robinhood won 2–1 on aggregate.

Third round

Robinhood won 6–3 on aggregate.

Final

Summary
The first leg was played on 14 November, and the second leg was played on 17 November 1982.

|}

First leg

Second leg

UNAM won 3–2 on aggregate.

References

1
CONCACAF Champions' Cup
c